Goodenia albiflora, commonly known as white goodenia, is a species of flowering plant in the family Goodeniaceae and endemic to South Australia. It is a small, erect shrub with ridged stems, elliptic to egg-shaped, cauline leaves, racemes of white flowers with leaf-like bracteoles at the base, and oval fruit.

Description

Taxonomy and naming
Goodenia albiflora was first formally described in 1847 by Diederich Franz Leonhard von Schlechtendal in the journal Linnaea: ein Journal für die Botanik in ihrem ganzen Umfange, oder Beiträge zur Pflanzenkunde. The specific epithet (albiflora) means "white-flowered".

Distribution and habitat
White goodenia grows in stony soil on steep slopes in woodland from the Eyre Peninsula to the Flinders Ranges and Mount Lofty Ranges of South Australia.

References

albiflora
Flora of South Australia
Plants described in 1846
Taxa named by Diederich Franz Leonhard von Schlechtendal